Vilimoni Koroi (born 17 April 1998) is a New Zealand rugby union player. Koroi was born to Fijian parents Taniela and Seruwaia in Whanganui and was a student at Feilding High School. Koroi played his first match for the New Zealand national rugby sevens team at the 2017 Wellington Sevens.

References

Living people
1998 births
New Zealand male rugby sevens players
New Zealand international rugby sevens players
New Zealand people of I-Taukei Fijian descent
Rugby union players from Whanganui
People educated at Feilding High School
Rugby sevens players at the 2018 Commonwealth Games
Commonwealth Games rugby sevens players of New Zealand
Commonwealth Games gold medallists for New Zealand
Commonwealth Games medallists in rugby sevens
New Zealand rugby union players
Rugby union fly-halves
Rugby union wings
Rugby union fullbacks
Otago rugby union players
Highlanders (rugby union) players
Medallists at the 2018 Commonwealth Games